Tissa, later Devanampiya Tissa, was one of the earliest kings of Sri Lanka based at the ancient capital of Anuradhapura from 247 BC to 207 BC. His reign was notable for the arrival of Buddhism in Sri Lanka under the aegis of the Mauryan Emperor Ashoka the Great. The primary source for his reign is the Mahavamsa, which in turn is based on the more ancient Dipavamsa.

Reign

Tissa was the second son of Mutasiva of Anuradhapura. The Mahavamsa describes him as being "foremost among all his brothers in virtue and intelligence".

The Mahavamsa mentions an early friendship with Ashoka. Chapter IX of the chronicle mentions that "the two monarchs, Devanampiyatissa and Dharmasoka, already had been friends a long time, though they had never seen each other", Dharmasoka being an alternate name for Ashoka. The chronicle also mentions Tissa sending gifts to the mighty emperor of the Maurya; in reply Ashoka sent not only gifts but also the news that he had converted to Buddhism, and a plea to Tissa to adopt the faith as well. The king does not appear to have done this at the time, instead adopting the name Devānaṃpiya "Beloved of the Gods" and having himself consecrated King of Lanka in a lavish celebration.

Devanampiyatissa is traditionally said to have been succeeded by his younger brothers Uttiya and Mahasiva. His other brother Mahanaga, Prince of Ruhuna was the founder of the Principality of Ruhuna.

Conversion to Buddhism
Emperor Ashoka took a keen interest in the propagation of Buddhism across the known world, and it was decided that his son, Mahinda, would travel to Sri Lanka and attempt to convert the people there. The events surrounding Mahinda's arrival and meeting with the king form one of the most important legends of Sri Lankan history.

According to the Mahavamsa king Devanampiyatissa was out enjoying a hunt with some 40,000 of his soldiers near a mountain called Mihintale. The date for this is traditionally associated with the full moon day of the month of Poson.

Having come to the foot of Missaka, Devanampiyatissa chased a stag into the thicket, and came across Mahinda (referred to with the honorific title Thera); the Mahavamsa has the great king 'terrified' and convinced that the Thera was in fact a 'yakka', or demon. However, Thera Mahinda declared that 'Recluses we are, O great King, disciples of the King of Dhamma (Buddha) Out of compassion for you alone have we come here from Jambudipa'. Devanampiyatissa recalled the news from his friend Ashoka and realised that these are missionaries sent from India. Thera Mahinda went on to preach to the king's company and preside over the king's conversion to Buddhism.

Important religious events
 Establishment of Buddhism in Sri Lanka due to the arrival of Thera Mahinda and his group.
 Planting of the Sacred Maha Bodhi (under which the Buddha attained Enlightenment) and the establishment of the Bhikkuni Sasana (order of the Buddhist nuns) due to the arrival of Theri Sangamitta and her group.
 Offering of the Mahamegavana to the Buddhist monks where the Maha Vihara monastery was built, which became the centre of Theravada Buddhism.
 Construction of Thuparama, the first historical dagaba which enshrined the right collar bone of the Buddha.

Notable locations

Given the extremely early date of Devanampiyatissa's reign and the dearth of sources it is difficult to discern what impact this conversion had, in practical terms, on Devanampiyatissa's reign. For example, whilst there are references to a Tissamahavihara and various other temples constructed by the king, none can be reliably located.

What is fairly certain however is that the site of his initial meeting with Thera Mahinda is one of Sri Lanka's most sacred sites today, going by the name Mihintale. The sacred precinct features the Ambasthala, or 'Mango tree stupa', where the Thera Mahinda asked the king a series of riddles to check his capacity for learning, the cave in which Thera Mahinda lived for over forty years, and the Maha Seya, wherein is contained a relic of the Buddha.

The other major site associated with Devanampiyatissa's reign is the planting of the Sri Maha Bodhi in Anuradhapura. The tree was yet another of Emperor Ashoka's gifts to the island and was planted within the precincts of Anuradhapura, and is regarded as the oldest human planted tree in the world.

Devanampiyatissa built Tissa Wewa, which covers 550 acres. The embankment alone is 2 miles long and 25 feet high. It is a major irrigation tank even today and is an essential resource for farmers in Anuradhapura.

Significance
Devanampiyatissa remains one of early Sri Lanka's most significant monarchs, given that his conversion to Buddhism set the kingdoms of the island down a religious and cultural route quite distinct from that of the subcontinent to the north. Later monarchs were to refer back to Devanampiyatissa's conversion as one of the cornerstones of the Anuradhapura polity. The city itself remained capital of a powerful kingdom until the early Middle Ages, when it was eventually subsumed under the Chola invasion and then superseded by Polonnaruwa.

See also
 Mahavamsa
 List of Sri Lankan monarchs
 History of Sri Lanka
 Buddhism in Sri Lanka
 Mahinda Thera
 Ashoka the Great
 Mihintale

Notes

References
 Keown, Damien, Stephen Hodge & Paola Tinti (2003). A Dictionary of Buddhism. Oxford University Press. .

External links
Mihintale
The Maha Bodhi 
The Mahavamsa History of Sri Lanka  The Great Chronicle of Sri Lanka
 Kings & Rulers of Sri Lanka
 Codrington's Short History of Ceylon
 King Devanampiyatissa

D
D

4th-century BC births
Converts to Buddhism
 Sinhalese Buddhist monarchs
D
D
D